Sampson Simson (1780 - 7 January 1857) was an Orthodox Jewish American  philanthropist most remembered as "the father of Mount Sinai Hospital" and as benefactor, posthumously, to the North American Relief Society for Indigent Jews in Jerusalem, Israel.

Biography

Simson was born in Danbury, Connecticut. His father was from Germany. He studied  under Aaron Burr, attended Columbia University in New York City, and graduated in 1800 with a degree in law, becoming one of the first Jewish lawyers in New York City.

After a few years practice, however, Simson abandoned his law career and retired to his Yonkers farm to devote himself to charitable work. Described as a very pious man with a "New England conscience", a combination of a "public-spirited citizen" and "conformist Jew", Simson received great pleasure from his charitable contributions, be they to a Catholic church, a Protestant church or a synagogue.

From 1825 until 1832, Simson served as the 2nd Grand Commander of the Northern Masonic Jurisdiction of the Scottish Rite of Freemasonry succeeding Daniel D. Tompkins in this position.

In 1852, Simson, along with eight other men representing various Hebrew charitable organizations, came together to establish the Jews' Hospital in New York, the institution that eventually (in 1866) became Mount Sinai Hospital. Its location, West 28th Street between 7th and 8th Avenues in New York City, was on land donated by Simson; he served the first president of its board of directors and personally assumed many of the young hospital's financial burdens. The Jews' Hospital opened two years before his death.

That same year, Simson joined Samuel Myer Isaacs and Adolphus Simeon Solomons to help found the Beth Hamedrash Hagodol.

Legacy

Simson's estate bequeathed large sums of money to Jewish and general institutions, including $50,000 that, after the death of a niece, should be paid "to any responsible corporation in this city whose permanent fund is established by its charter for the purpose of ameliorating the condition of the Jews in Jerusalem, Palestine." In 1888, the New York State Supreme Court decided that the sum, plus 30 years' interest, was to be paid to the North American Relief Society for Indigent Jews in Jerusalem. However, the niece's heir appealed the ruling, and the New York State Court of Appeals overturned it on what would today be considered a technicality (the difference between "charitable" and "benevolent" purposes), awarding the full amount to the heir.
 
Mount Sinai Hospital was recently ranked as one of the best hospitals in the United States by U.S. News & World Report.

See also
List of first minority male lawyers and judges in New York

References

External links 
 Mount Sinai Hospital homepage
 freemasonry.org

1780 births
1857 deaths
19th-century American philanthropists
American people of German-Jewish descent
Jewish American philanthropists
Columbia College (New York) alumni
People from Danbury, Connecticut